Jumbles are simple butter cookies made with a basic recipe of flour, sugar, eggs, and butter. They can be flavored with vanilla, anise, or caraway seed used for flavoring, or other flavoring can be used like almond. They were formerly often made in the form of rings or rolls.

Jumbles were widespread, specifically because they travelled well, thanks to their very dense, hard nature. They could be stored for up to a year without becoming too stale. Because of their density, they were sometimes twisted into knots before baking, in order to make them easier to eat, generating knots as another common name.

Jumbles were traditionally shaped in intricate loop or knot patterns, usually of rolled out dough. Early flavouring agents were aniseed, coriander, caraway seeds and rosewater. Later, especially in the United States, jumbles referred to a thin crisp cake or cookie using lemon-peel as a flavoring agent.

Terminology
Jumbles and cookies are very similar, and sometimes a jumble may be called a cookie, but cookie is a broader term for any small flat cake, used for small cakes as well as crisp ones, while jumbles are usually of the crisp variety.

A 1907 recipe for jumbles describes their texture as "crisp like snaps". The dough should be "so thin after rolling and cutting out, that one can almost see through them". The only moisture in the recipe is the creamed butter and "a scant cupful of milk or enough to make a stiff dough about like pie crust".

History

A recipe for "Almond Jumballs" is known from 1694, made by combining ground almond with orange flower water or rose water, then adding sugar syrup, dry sugar and egg whites. The ingredients were pounded to make a paste and could be colored with chocolate or cochineal. They were brushed with lemon juice or rose water for enhanced flavor and very gently baked, with the caution that "it is best to sett them on something that they may not touch ye bottome of ye Oven."

Jumbles were widespread in Europe by the 17th century, but possibly originated in Italy as the cimabetta. A very common cookie for travelers, they were probably brought to America on the Mayflower, if not Jamestown previously. There is even a famous recipe for this type of cookie that is credited to Martha Washington.

An 18th-century recipe from The Compleat Housewife is made by beating three egg whites with milk. flour, sugar and caraway seeds into a stiff paste. They could be made in any shape and baked on baking parchment.

Originally, jumbles were twisted into various pretzel-like shapes and boiled. By the late 18th century, jumbles became rolled cookies that were baked, producing a cookie very similar to a modern sugar cookie, although without the baking powder or other leavening agents used in modern recipes.

Victorian cookbooks contain recipes for many variations on the basic recipe with candied fruits, coconut, lemon, and other flavorings added.

Preparation

To make jumbles butter and sugar are creamed together, then eggs or egg yolks are added, sometimes with milk, depending on the type of jumbles being made. Then the dry ingredients are added: flour, and any other ingredients like grated coconut, flavor extracts, and spices like cloves, cinnamon or allspice. Baking soda or baking powder can be added, and raisins. Sometimes the egg whites are whipped to a froth and added separately after the dried ingredients. The cookie dough can be rolled in sugar or cinnamon before baking. Techniques vary from recipe to recipe. There are many different types of jumbles: sugar jumbles, coconut jumbles, cinnamon jumbles, fruit jumbles (hermits).
A 1907 recipe for "cocoanut jumbles" is made with a 1:3 ratio of butter to sugar.

Etymology
The word "jumble" is derived from the French jumelle, meaning "twin", because of their shape.

Notes

External links
 Sugar Cookies @ The Food Timeline

Cookies
British desserts
British snack foods
American desserts
Anise
Foods containing coconut
Tea culture